CKAL-DT (channel 5) is a television station in Calgary, Alberta, Canada, part of the Citytv network. It is owned and operated by Rogers Sports & Media alongside Omni Television station CJCO-DT (channel 38). Both stations share studios at 7 Avenue and 5 Street Southwest in Downtown Calgary, while CKAL-DT's transmitter is located near Old Banff Coach Road/Highway 563.

History

As an A-Channel O&O

The station launched on VHF channel 5 on September 20, 1997, under the ownership of Craig Media, two days after its A-Channel sister station CKEM-TV in Edmonton went on the air for the first time. It billed itself as a station with a very deep connection to Calgary, and whose schedule was not determined by interests in Toronto. Its slogan was "Very independent, very Calgary!" CKAL's opening was marked with a street party and its main studio was easily visible from passersby on 7th Avenue; during the station's first year it even operated a small cafe near its main entrance.
 
CKEM's master control operations were moved to CKAL's facility in Calgary in 2003. Nine employees working at CKAL were laid off on May 19, 2004 in addition to a 28-employee layoff at Craig Media's CKXT-TV in Toronto. Craig Media said the cuts were made to "further rationalize its operations and control costs".

As a City O&O

In 2004, Craig Media announced a deal to sell its conventional television assets, including the A-Channel stations, to CHUM Limited. The sale was approved by the Canadian Radio-television and Telecommunications Commission (CRTC) on November 19, 2004, and was finalized on December 1. On February 3, 2005, CHUM announced that the A-Channel stations would be relaunched as part of the Citytv television system. The changes took effect August 2.

On July 12, 2006, it was announced that CTVglobemedia would acquire CHUM Limited and its assets, including the Citytv system. As a result of this merger, CKAL added CHMI-TV to its master control duties. The following year, the CRTC announced its approval of CTVglobemedia's purchase of CHUM, but added a condition that CTVglobemedia must sell off CHUM's Citytv stations (including CKAL) to another buyer, although the company was allowed to keep the A-Channel stations since they have CFCN-TV in the same area. On June 12, Rogers Media announced that it would acquire the five Citytv stations (including CKAL) from CTVglobemedia. As a result, effective August 29, the station took over master control duties for sister Citytv station CKVU-TV in Vancouver. The Rogers transaction was approved by the CRTC on September 28 and was officially completed October 31.

News operation

On July 12, 2006 as a result of the CTVglobemedia/CHUM Limited merger, CKAL's local newscasts (with the exception of the noon newscast) were immediately discontinued; the local newscasts were replaced by the half-hour newsmagazine program Your City at 6 and 11 p.m., along with CityNews International—a national newscast produced from CITY-TV in Toronto.

On January 19, 2010, CKAL laid off many additional news personalities as part of restructuring operations. This resulted in Your City, The City Show and CityNews International being cancelled. Since then, the only remaining local program produced by CKAL was the morning show Breakfast Television.

On September 3, 2018, CKAL added hour-long newscasts at 6 and 11 p.m. nightly, as part of a larger expansion of local news programming across the Citytv stations.

On September 5, 2019, Rogers laid off 11 employees from CKAL and placed Breakfast Television on hiatus until September 23. At this time the program was relaunched with a new hybrid format, consisting of a mixture of local content with national entertainment and lifestyle segments produced from Toronto.

On November 17, 2020, Rogers Sports & Media imposed staff cuts across the country, including cancelling Breakfast Television in Calgary.

Notable former on–air staff
 Jill Belland – Live Eye reporter
 Liza Fromer – Anchor / reporter
 Robin Gill – Anchor / reporter
 Ross Hull – Citytv Calgary weather specialist (later with CFPL-DT in London and CKCO-TV in Kitchener; now with CIII-DT in Toronto)
 Sandra Jansen – host of the Calgary edition of Your City
 Tara Slone – co-host

Technical information

Subchannel

Analogue-to-digital conversion
CKAL began testing its digital signal on August 31, 2010, on UHF channel 49. On August 31, 2011, when Canadian television stations in CRTC-designated mandatory markets transitioned from analogue to digital broadcasts, the station's digital signal remained on UHF channel 49. Through the use of PSIP, digital television receivers display CKAL-TV's virtual channel as 5.1. On August 13, 2011, the Lethbridge retransmitter started broadcasting CKAL-DT on channel 46 (virtual channel 2.1).

Rebroadcaster

References

External links

KAL-DT
Television channels and stations established in 1997
KAL-DT
1997 establishments in Alberta